Kleine Flöte (German for "small flute") can refer to:
 piccolo
 Sopranino recorder, in use of Michael Praetorius
 Alto recorder, in usage of Sebastian Virdung